Joaquín Felipe Oláiz y Zabalza (born 6 June 1872 in Pamplona) was a Spanish clergyman and auxiliary bishop for the Roman Catholic Archdiocese of Agaña. He became ordained in 1896. He was appointed bishop (or apostolic vicar) in 1914. He died in 1945.

References

Spanish Roman Catholic bishops
1872 births
1945 deaths
People from Pamplona
Roman Catholic bishops of Agaña